Joseph Medill McCormick (May 16, 1877 – February 25, 1925) was part of the McCormick family of businessmen and politicians in Chicago. After working for some time and becoming part owner of the Chicago Tribune, which his maternal grandfather had owned, he entered politics.

After serving in the State House, he was elected both as a Representative in the United States Congress and later as a US Senator from Illinois.

Early life 
Joseph Medill McCormick was born in Chicago on May 16, 1877.  His father was the future diplomat Robert Sanderson McCormick (1849–1919), who was a nephew of Cyrus McCormick.

McCormick was an early pupil at Ludgrove School when his father was based in Europe. He later attended the Groton School, a preparatory school at Groton, Massachusetts.  He graduated from Yale University in 1900, where he was elected to the secret society Scroll and Key.

He worked as a newspaper reporter and publisher, and became an owner of the Chicago Daily Tribune. He later purchased interests in The Cleveland Leader and Cleveland News. In 1901 he served as a war correspondent in the Philippine Islands.

Marriage and family
In 1903 he married Ruth Hanna, daughter of the Ohio Senator Mark Hanna. They had three children: 
Ruth "Bazy" McCormick, (1921–2013) who married Peter Miller and then Garvin Tankersley.  As Bazy Miller, she founded Al-Marah Arabians, a breeding and training farm for Arabian horses formerly in Tucson, Arizona, which operates in Florida, under the ownership of her son, Mark Miller.
Katrina McCormick (1913–2011), who married Courtlandt Dixon Barnes Jr.
John Medill McCormick, called "Johnny", died in a mountain-climbing accident in 1938.

The Chicago Tribune 
McCormick was a grandson of the Tribune owner Joseph Medill.  His mother Katherine Medill McCormick hoped that leadership of the paper would pass from her brother-in-law, Robert Wilson Patterson, to her first son. Joseph Medill McCormick took over much of the management of the paper between 1903 and 1907, but became increasingly depressed and developed alcoholism. In 1907–1908, he spent some time under the care of the psychoanalyst Carl Jung in Zurich, and subsequently followed Jung's advice to detach himself from the family newspaper.

His younger brother, the famed "Colonel" Robert McCormick (1880–1955) became involved in the newspaper, worked closely on it for four decades, and was a leading isolationist figure in the Republican Party.

Political career 
McCormick was vice chairman of the national campaign committee of the Progressive Republican movement from 1912 to 1914. He was elected to the Illinois House of Representatives in 1912 and 1914.

Afterward he advanced to national office, being elected to the United States House of Representatives, where he served one term from March 4, 1917, to March 3, 1919. He was elected to the United States Senate in 1918, and served from March 4, 1919, until his death at age 48 in 1925. In the Senate, McCormick was chairman of the Committee on Expenditures in the Department of Labor and the Committee on Expenditures in Executive Departments.

In the primary election of 1924, McCormick lost the Republican U.S. Senate nomination to Charles S. Deneen, who had previously served as the 23rd Governor of Illinois. Deenen defeated McCormick by a narrow 0.69% margin (only 5,944 votes).

Death
McCormick died on February 25, 1925, in his hotel suite at the Hamilton Hotel in Washington, D.C.. Although it was not publicized at the time, his death was considered suicide. At the time of his death, McCormick was about to leave office. His reelection loss is believed to have contributed to his apparent suicide. McCormick was interred in Middle Creek Cemetery, near Byron, Illinois.

Family tree

Paternal side

Maternal side

See also
List of United States Congress members who died in office (1900–49)

References

 American National Biography
 Dictionary of American Biography
 Miller, Kristie. Ruth Hanna McCormick: A Life in Politics from 1880 to 1944. Albuquerque, NM: University of New Mexico Press, 1992
 Stone, Ralph A. "Two Illinois Senators Among the Irreconcileables." Mississippi Valley Historical Review  50 (December 1963): 443–65.

External links
 
 

1877 births
1925 suicides
American male journalists
Groton School alumni
McCormick family
Medill-Patterson family
Republican Party members of the Illinois House of Representatives
People from Ogle County, Illinois
American politicians who committed suicide
Republican Party United States senators from Illinois
Republican Party members of the United States House of Representatives from Illinois
People educated at Ludgrove School